The Busker is a Maltese indie pop band founded in 2012. The band consists of David "Dav.Jr" Meilak, Jean Paul Borg, and Sean Meachen. They are set to represent Malta in the Eurovision Song Contest 2023 with the song "Dance (Our Own Party)".

Career 
The Busker was formed in October 2012 by singer and guitarist Dario Genovese and percussionist Jean Paul Borg. Two years later, bassist and keyboardist David Grech and saxophonist Sean Meachen joined. The group draws inspiration from 1960s pop bands such as The Beatles and The Beach Boys. They started posting covers and original music on YouTube. Their debut album, "Telegram", was released in 2017, followed by "Ladies and Gentlemen" the following year. Genovese left the group in 2021.

In November 2022, The Busker was confirmed to be among the 40 participants in the Malta Eurovision Song Contest 2023, a festival used to select the Maltese representative in the annual Eurovision Song Contest. Their competing song, "Dance (Our Own Party)", was submitted the following month. After qualifying first from the quarter-finals and then the semi-finals of the Malta Eurovision Song Contest, on 11 February 2023 The Busker performed in the final, where they won with the combined support of the judging and televoting. Their victory granted them the right to represent Malta at the Eurovision Song Contest 2023 in Liverpool.

Members 
 Current
 David "Dav.Jr" Meilak – lead vocals, guitars
 Jean Paul Borg – drums
 Sean Meachen – saxophone

 Former
 Dario Genovese – vocals, guitar
 David Grech – bass

Discography

Studio albums 
 2017 – Telegram
 2018 – Ladies and Gentlemen

EP 
 2021 – X

Singles 
 2020 – "Just a Little Bit More" (with Matthew James)
 2021 – "Don't You Tell Me What to Feel" (with Raquela DG)
 2021 – "Loose"
 2021 – "Nothing More"
 2022 – "Miracle"
 2023 – "Dance (Our Own Party)"

References 

Indie pop groups
Maltese alternative rock groups
Musical groups established in 2012
2012 establishments in Malta
Eurovision Song Contest entrants for Malta
Eurovision Song Contest entrants of 2023